Jaguariúna is a municipality in the state of São Paulo in Brazil. It is part of the Metropolitan Region of Campinas. The population is 58,722 (2020 est.) in an area of 141.39 km². The elevation is 584 m. This place name comes from the Tupi language and means the river of the black Jaguars.

References

Municipalities in São Paulo (state)